Svyatoslav Vladimirovich Vitman, primarily known under the pen name Svyatoslav Loginov  (born October 9, 1951 in Ussuriysk, Russia (then Voroshilov, USSR)) is a Russian writer. He writes mostly science fiction.

His first publication was in 1975, in Uralsky Sledopyt (Ural Pathfinder) magazine.
Loginov defines himself as a convinced atheist. These motifs run through many of his works.

Bibliography

Novels
 Многорукий бог далайна (Polyhand God of Dalain, 1995)
 Чёрная кровь (Black Blood, 1996) with Nick Perumov
 Колодезь (Well, 1997) 
 Земные пути (Terrestrial Ways, 1999)
 Чёрный смерч (The Black Tornado, 1999)
 Картёжник (The Gambler, 2000)
 Свет в окошке (A Light in the Window, 2002)
 Имперские ведьмы (Imperial Witches, 2003)
 Атака извне (Attack from Outside, 2005) with Boris Zelenskiy	 	
 Дорогой широкой (On the Broad Road, 2005)
 Россия за облаком (Russia Behind the Cloud, 2007)

Awards
InterPressCon Prize (1995, 1998, 1999, 2006)
1995: for novel Mnogoruky bog dalaina [Polyhand God of Dalain]
Aelita Prize (2008)
Strannik Prize (2003)
Belyaev Prize (1995)

References

1951 births
Living people
People from Ussuriysk
Russian science fiction writers
Soviet science fiction writers
Soviet male writers
20th-century Russian male writers